Muslim Youth ( Sāzmān-i Jawānān-i Musulmān) was an Islamist group founded in 1969 in Kabul by several Afghan junior professors and a handful of students at Kabul University.  Many of the leading figures of the Soviet–Afghan War were members of this group, including Professor Mawlavi Habibur Rahman, Engineer Habibur Rahman, Saifuddin Nasratyar, and Engineer Gulbuddin Hekmatyar.

History
The Muslim Youth Organization was founded in 1969 in Kabul, at a critical point in Afghanistan's history, with proponents of communism and Qutb-inspired Islamism vying fiercely to gain supremacy in determining the direction of the state and society. Kabul University was a center of this conflict, with both Marxists and Islamists on the faculty and corresponding student organizations dedicated to the respective ideologies. One professor of the Shar`ia faculty (the department for the study of Islamic law), the future mujahidin leader Burhanuddin Rabbani, had recently translated Sayyid Qutb's Milestones (Ma`alim fi'l-tariq) into Dari and was teaching this text at the University.

It was in this context that the Muslim Youth Organization was formed, and at its founding Rabbani was named its chairman, Sayyaf its vice-chairman, and Hekmatyar—though still in prison for the murder of a Maoist student—its political director. The group, in this form anyway, was short-lived; after a failed uprising attempt in Panjshir Valley in 1975 where it failed to gain local support, the Republic's government of Sardar Mohammed Daoud Khan cracked down on Islamists, leading to all of the Muslim Youth leaders fleeing to Pakistan and the Organization itself ceased to exist. Its leaders continued to pursue its mission, however, and eventually went on to lead a successful insurgency war against the Marxist Democratic Republic of Afghanistan, backed by the Soviet Union, between 1979 and 1989.

References
 Coll, Steve. Ghost Wars: The Secret History of the CIA, Afghanistan, and Bin Laden, from the Soviet Invasion to September 10, 2001. New York: Penguin, 2004.
 Roy, Olivier. Afghanistan: From Holy War to Civil War. Princeton, NJ: Darwin University Press, 1995.
 Idem. Islam and Resistance in Afghanistan. Cambridge and New York: Cambridge University Press, 1986.
 Rubin, Barnett R. The Fragmentation of Afghanistan: State Formation and Collapse in the International System. New Haven: Yale University Press, 1995.

Specific

Youth organizations established in 1969
Islamic youth organizations
Islamism in Afghanistan
Youth organisations based in Afghanistan
History of Islam in Afghanistan